Kakani Nagar is a neighborhood situated on the  Visakhapatnam City, India. The area, which falls under the local administrative limits of Greater Visakhapatnam Municipal Corporation, is about 3 km from the Visakhapatnam Airport. Kakani Nagar is a well residential colony its well connected with Gajuwaka  and Maddilapalem

Transport
APSRTC routes:

References

Neighbourhoods in Visakhapatnam